The 1320s was a decade of the Julian Calendar which began on January 1, 1320, and ended on December 31, 1329.

Significant people

References